Sergio Hughes (born 24 February 2004) is a Sint Maartener footballer who plays for NEC Nijmegen, and the Sint Maarten national team.

Club career
As a youth Hughes played for IJVV De Zwervers, along with his brothers Serfinio and Granley. Ahead of the 2016/17 season he moved to the academy of Vitesse where he stayed until 2019. During his time with the club, he scored twenty five goals in official youth league and cup competitions. The following season Hughes moved to the academy of NEC Nijmegen of the Eredivisie.

International career
In 2018 Hughes was named to the Netherlands' extended under-16 roster for the UEFA Development Tournament in Portugal. He went on to make his senior international debut for Sint Maarten on 3 June 2022 in a 2022–23 CONCACAF Nations League C match against the U.S. Virgin Islands. He scored his first two international goals in a 8–2 victory over the Turks and Caicos Islands. Hughes' two goals helped Sint Maarten set a new record for highest-ever margin of victory in official CONCACAF competition.

International goals
Scores and results list Sint Maarten's goal tally first.

International career statistics

References

External links

SBV Vitesse profile
NEC profile

Living people
2004 births
Association football midfielders
Sint Maarten international footballers
Dutch Antillean footballers